Miguel Abensour (13 February 1939 – 22 April 2017) was a French philosopher specializing in political philosophy. He was emeritus professor of political philosophy at the Paris Diderot University (Jussieu) and a former president of the Collège international de philosophie.

Research and works 
Abensour has written for the revues Textures, Libre, and Tumultes. Director of the collection Critique de la politique (published by Payot & Rivages) since 1974, he was notable in contributing to the reception of the Frankfurt School in France. In his works and numerous articles, he has sought to reconcile democracy, understood as "democracy against the state", with the idea of utopia, conceived from Emmanuel Levinas's criticism of Martin Buber's idea of interpersonal relations: the I and Thou relationship opposed to the I and It.

He has also published numerous articles on Emmanuel Levinas, Claude Lefort, Saint-Just, utopian socialism (Pierre Leroux, William Morris), Blanqui, and members of the Frankfurt School.

An anthology and critique of his works was published in 2006 by Sens & Tonka, Critique de la politique. Autour de Miguel Abensour, edited by Anne Kupiec and Étienne Tassin.

Works 
Instructions pour une prise d'armes. L'éternité par les astres. Hypothèse astronomique et autres textes d'Auguste Blanqui établis et présentés par Miguel Abensour et Valentin Pelosse, Paris, Tête de Feuilles, 1973; re-edited by Sens & Tonka in 2000.
De la compacité : architecture et régimes totalitaires, Paris, Sens & Tonka, 1997.
L'Utopie de Thomas More à Walter Benjamin, Paris, Sens & Tonka, 2000. [English translation: Utopia from Thomas More to Walter Benjamin, Minneapolis, Univocal Publishing, 2017].
Le Procès des maîtres rêveurs, Arles, Sulliver, 2000.
La Démocratie contre l'État : Marx et le moment machiavélien, Paris, Le Félin, 2004. [English translation: Democracy against the State: Marx and the Machiavellian Moment, Cambridge, Polity, 2011].
Rire des lois, du magistrat et des dieux : l'impulsion Saint-just, Lyon, Horlieu, 2005.
Hannah Arendt contre la philosophie politique ?, Paris, Sens & Tonka, 2006.
Maximilien Rubel, pour redécouvrir Marx, in collaboration with Louis Janover, Paris, Sens & Tonka, 2008.
Pour une philosophie politique critique, Paris, Sens & Tonka, 2009.
L'Homme est un animal utopique / Utopiques II, Arles, Les Editions de La Nuit, 2010.
Le Procès des maîtres rêveurs (nouvelle édition augmentée) / Utopiques I, Arles, Les Editions de La Nuit, 2011.

References 

1939 births
2017 deaths
20th-century French philosophers
French political scientists
Academic staff of the University of Paris
French male non-fiction writers